Aam Aadmi Mohalla Clinics (AAMC), also known as Mohalla Clinics, are primary health centres in the union territory of Delhi and state of Punjab in India. They offer a basic package of essential health services including medicines, diagnostics, and consultation free of cost. The word Mohalla in Hindi means neighborhood or community. These clinics serve as the first point of contact for the population, offer timely services, and reduce the high amount of referrals to secondary and tertiary health facilities in the state.

Background

Mohalla Clinics was first set up by the Aam Aadmi Party government in October 2015, and as of 2020, 300 such clinics have been set up across the city and served more than 16.24 million residents. The Government has kept a promise of setting up 1000 such clinics in the city before the 2020 Delhi Legislative Assembly Elections. According to the World Health Organization data for the year 2015, more than 65% of the population in India paid for health from their own pockets. The Hindu, meanwhile reported in 2017 that only 17% of people in the country have health insurance. The idea behind the initiative is that India, being one of the largest out-of-pocket health expenditures and the least coverage of health insurance in the world, can offer the free health services in the form of Mohalla Clinics thus to help reduce the financial burden on low-income households by saving travel costs and lost wages.

Reception

In December 2017, India renowned cardiac surgeon and founder of Narayana Health, Dr. Devi Prasad Shetty from Karnataka, visited a Mohalla Clinic in Todapur, Delhi. He was amazed by the healthcare facilities provided to the general public by the Delhi Government. In a letter to Delhi Chief Minister Arvind Kejriwal, in the capacity as chair of The Elders, an international non-governmental organisation of independent global leaders founded by Nelson Mandela, and former Secretary-General of the United Nations Kofi Annan commended Mohalla Clinic project. The project was also praised by the former Prime Minister of Norway Gro Harlem Brundtland at the Prince Mahidol Award Conference at Bangkok, after a presentation by Delhi health minister Satyendra Kumar Jain.

The Straits Times, an English-language daily broadsheet newspaper based in Singapore finds Mohalla Clinics to be high-tech where results of most of the tests are known within two minutes and are uploaded onto an IT cloud for access by patients and their doctors on their smartphones and the clinic's tablets. Meanwhile, in a report published by The Washington Post, it suggests "It may well be time for America to build mohalla clinics in its cities". However, the writer of the article later criticised the AAP government for misrepresentation of his words as well as making false claims on the basis of which this report was written and published.

A vigilance probe in the year 2017 also put a question on the quality of healthcare being received by the patients with every doctor treating 2 patients per minute, which comes out to a patient only getting 36 seconds to not only state their ailment but also get treatment.

Instances of untouchability have been reported which in some forms does exist in AAMCs as "health practitioners overwhelmingly and disproportionately belong to upper and middle castes," who "often assert a pattern of dominance." Researchers found "large-scale segregation within slums, most notably against Dalits, particularly Valmikis and Chamars," which also has led to "discrimination in terms of healthcare access since some upper-caste house-owners stopped people from oppressed castes from entering clinics that were operating on their property." In 2022, Bhagwant Mann led government declared that 75 such clinics will be made in Punjab.

References

External links
 Article: Mohalla Clinics of Delhi at United States National Library of Medicine
 Article: Health Care in the Mohallas at Stanford Social Innovation Review
 Aam Aadmi Mohalla Clinics at Delhi Government's Web Portal

Clinics in India